Apoplania valdiviana is a species of moth belonging to the family Neopseustidae. It was described by Davis and Nielsen in 1985. It is known from the south-western part of the Neuquen Province of Argentina and the eastern part of the Osorno Province and the Cautin Province in Chile.

The habitat consists of rich temperate rainforest and Valdivian forest in the Puyehue area around Aguas Calientes and Anticura in Chile on the western side of the Andes, as well as Valdivian-type forest on the north-western side of Lago Lacar in Argentina on the eastern side of the Andes, in an area otherwise dominated by deciduous Nothofagus forest. Finally, two specimens were collected east of Volcan Villarrica in secondary Nothofagus forest.

The wingspan is 18.5–20 mm for males and 17.5–20 mm for females. All specimens were collected between mid November and mid December, with the highest number being collected during the first part of the period.

References

Neopseustidae
Moths of South America
Fauna of the Valdivian temperate rainforest